Hooker County is a county in the U.S. state of Nebraska. As of the 2010 United States Census, the population was 736. Its county seat is Mullen, which (as of 2019) is the county's only community of substantial size.

In the Nebraska license plate system, Hooker County is represented by the prefix 93, because it had the smallest number of registered vehicles out of the state's 93 counties when the licensing system was established in 1922.

History
Hooker County was formed in 1889 with construction of a line for Chicago, Burlington and Quincy Railroad into the territory. It was named for Civil War General Joseph Hooker.

Geography
The terrain of Hooker County consists of low rolling hills running east–west. The Middle Loup River flows eastward through the upper part of the county.

Most of Nebraska's 93 counties (the eastern 2/3) observe Central Time; the western counties observe Mountain Time. Hooker County is the easternmost of the Nebraska counties to observe Mountain Time.

Major highways
  Nebraska Highway 2
  Nebraska Highway 97

Adjacent counties

 Cherry County – north
 Thomas County – east (Central Time Zone boundary)
 McPherson County – south
 Arthur County – southwest
 Grant County – west

Lakes
 Carr Lake
 Jefford Lake

Demographics

As of the 2000 United States Census,  there were 783 people, 335 households, and 220 families in the county. The population density was 1.0 person per square mile (0.4/km2). There were 440 housing units at an average density of 0.6 per square mile (0.2/km2). The racial makeup of the county was 98.72% White, 0.38% Native American, 0.13% Asian, 0.13% from other races, and 0.64% from two or more races. 1.02% of the population were Hispanic or Latino of any race.

There were 335 households, out of which 26.90% had children under the age of 18 living with them, 60.30% were married couples living together, 3.90% had a female householder with no husband present, and 34.30% were non-families. 33.10% of all households were made up of individuals, and 19.10% had someone living alone who was 65 years of age or older. The average household size was 2.26 and the average family size was 2.90.

The county population contained 24.00% under the age of 18, 4.10% from 18 to 24, 21.60% from 25 to 44, 23.40% from 45 to 64, and 26.90% who were 65 years of age or older. The median age was 45 years. For every 100 females there were 83.40 males. For every 100 females age 18 and over, there were 84.80 males.

The median income for a household in the county was $27,868, and the median income for a family was $35,114. Males had a median income of $25,234 versus $16,250 for females. The per capita income for the county was $15,513. About 4.90% of families and 6.90% of the population were below the poverty line, including 5.30% of those under age 18 and 13.10% of those age 65 or over.

Communities

Village 
 Mullen (county seat)

Former community 
 Dunwell

Politics
Hooker County voters have been overwhelmingly Republican ever since World War II. The last Democratic presidential candidate to carry the county was Franklin D. Roosevelt in 1932 when the region was decimated by the Dust Bowl, and in no presidential election since 1936 has the Democratic nominee reached thirty percent of the county's vote – a record of Republican dominance equalled only by the Unionist Kentucky counties of Jackson and Clinton where no Democrat has passed thirty percent since before 1896. In 1968 Hooker was the nation's most Republican county, and it was in the top ten most Republican in 1960, 1976, and 1984.

See also
 National Register of Historic Places listings in Hooker County, Nebraska

References

External links
 County website

 
Nebraska counties
1889 establishments in Nebraska
Populated places established in 1889